Florence Converse (1871–1967) was an American author.

Biography
Florence Converse was born in New Orleans in 1871.

She graduated from Wellesley College in 1893 and was a member of the editorial staff of The Churchman from 1900 to 1908, when she joined the staff of the Atlantic Monthly. Converse wrote several novels. These included Long Will, a novel about the Peasants' Revolt of 1381.

She was in a lesbian relationship with Vida Dutton Scudder and they are buried alongside each other at Newton Cemetery, Newton, Massachusetts.

Bibliography
 Diana Victrix (1897)
 The Burden of Christopher (1900)
 Long Will, A Romance (1903)
 The House of Prayer (1908)
 A Masque of Sibyls (1910)
 The Children of Light (1912)
 The Story of Wellesley (1915)
 The Blessed Birthday (1917)
 Garments of Praise (1921)
 Thy Kingdom Come: A Dream for Easter Even (1921)
 Santa Conversazione: An All Saints Miracle (1921)
 The Holy night (1922)
 The Happy Swan (1925)
 Into the Void (1926)
 Sphinx (1931)
 Efficiency Expert (1934)
 Collected poems of Florence Converse (1937)
 The Madman and the Wrecking Crew (Crux Ave, Spes Unica) (1939)
 Wellesley College, a chronicle of the years 1875-1938 (1939)
 Prologue to Peace: the Poems of Two Wars (1949)

References

Attribution

External links 
 
 

1871 births
1967 deaths
19th-century American novelists
Writers from New Orleans
Wellesley College alumni
LGBT people from Louisiana
20th-century American novelists
American LGBT novelists
American women novelists
American women journalists
20th-century American women writers
19th-century American women writers
Novelists from Louisiana
20th-century American non-fiction writers
American historical novelists
Women historical novelists
Writers of historical fiction set in the Middle Ages